Maria Stolbova (born 3 May 1984 in Perm) is a Russian rhythmic gymnast, an Honoured Master of Sports, and a World and European champion.

Biography 
Stolbova was born in Perm in 1984. She won a silver medal at the Russian Junior Championship in 1996. In 1998, she was admitted to the Specialised School for Young Olympic Trainees No. 74 in Moscow. Later that year she became a member of the Russian youth team. 
 
In 1999, she won the Championship of the Russian Armed Forces. 

In 2002, she won gold in group exercises with the Russian national team (alongside Ksenia Dzhalaganiya and others) at both the World and European Rhythmic Gymnastics Championships. 
 
After retiring from professional sport that year, she became a model, posing for photoshoots in Playboy, Maxim and other magazines. 
 
In 2009, she married businessman George (Egor) Vitalievich Sirota. 

In 2016, she moved to London with her family, where she opened two sports clubs: Centrum Gymnastics and Maria Stolbova’s Rhythmic Gymnastics Academy (where she  works as a senior coach).

References

External links 
 Stolbova Maria (RUS) hoop Championships of Russia 1999
 Shooting by Maria Stolbova for Maxim magazine

Living people
Russian rhythmic gymnasts
Russian gymnastics coaches
1984 births
Medalists at the Rhythmic Gymnastics World Championships
Medalists at the Rhythmic Gymnastics European Championships
Sportspeople from Perm, Russia